This is a summary of the highest scoring matches and biggest winning margins in the Eliteserien since its establishment as a one-group top flight in the 1963 season. The record for the biggest win is Rosenborg's 10–0 victory against Brann at Lerkendal Stadion on 5 May 1996. Lyn are the only club to have scored eleven goals in a Norwegian top flight game - in their 11–2 victory over Viking in Oslo on 28 July 1968. Strømsgodset are the third club that have scored 10 goals ore more, a feat the team achieved in their 10–1 victory over Lyn at Marienlyst Stadion on 16 June 1968. Stabæk hold the records for both the most goals scored in an away game and the biggest winning margin away from home with an 9–0 victory over Sogndal at Fosshaugane in Sogndal on 25 October 1998.

The highest scoring game is Lyn's 11–2 win against Viking on 28 July 1968.

Highest scoring games

Biggest winning margin

References

highest scoring games
Eliteserien records and statistics
Eliteserien
Highest-scoring association football matches